Who's Got the 10½? is a live album by the American hardcore punk rock band Black Flag. It was released on March 19, 1986 through SST Records. The album was recorded live at Starry Night in Portland, Oregon on August 23, 1985.

This album was recorded by the DogFish Sound mobile recording truck owned by Drew Canulette and Norm Costa, and based in Newberg, OR. Henry Rollins referred to the recording as his favorite Black Flag album on his 2018 Keep Talking, Pal special.

Track listing

Personnel
 Henry Rollins – lead vocals
 Greg Ginn – guitar
 Kira Roessler – bass
 Anthony Martinez – drums
Drew Canulette - recording engineer
Jeffrey Bruton - assistant recording engineer
Norm Costa - recording production director

References

Black Flag (band) live albums
1986 live albums
SST Records live albums